Newbolt is a surname. Notable people with the surname include:

Sir Henry Newbolt (1862–1938), English poet
Sir Francis Newbolt (1863-1940), English barrister, judge, writer and etcher
John Henry Newbolt (1769–1823), English judge and founder of the Madras Literary Society
William Newbolt (1844–1930), British Anglican priest and theologian

See also
Newbold (name)
Newbould